Arch Hades (born 17 March 1992) is a British poet. Hades writes lyrical poetry about modern romance and poetry-of-philosophy. Her poetry volumes include High Tide, Fool's Gold, Paper Romance, and Arcadia.

Life and education
Hades was born on 17 March 1992 in Saint Petersburg, Russia. Her birth name is not Arch Hades, and she has legally changed her name several times. Her father, a businessman who embraced democracy and liberalism, was murdered in an alleyway in Saint Petersburg. At 8, she fled to London with the rest of her family, and they changed their names.

She was enrolled at Hill House Preparatory School before spending seven years at Wycombe Abbey, an all-girls boarding school until she was 18. After graduating from university, she began her career in politics.

Career
After graduation, she worked as a parliamentary researcher. Later, she started posting her poetry on Instagram, generating a large fan following.

Hades is the author of four volumes of poetry: High Tide (2018), Fool's Gold (2020), Paper Romance (2021), and Arcadia (2022). She also collaborated with Andrés Reisinger and Grammy-winning musician RAC to create Arcadia, a narrated graphic film.

In March 2021, Arch Hades sold her first artwork, a postcard, for $71,410.

In November 2021, Hades auctioned her poem Arcadia at Christie's 21C sale in New York in the form of long abstract animation, soundtracked with a voiceover and electronic music. Arcadia was sold for $525,000.

In May 2022, the Arcadia digital film had its museum debut at the Palazzo Strozzi Let's Get Digital exhibition.

In addition, she also contributes commentary on cultural discourse to newspapers, performs poetry readings, and gives talks on philosophy. In 2021, she spoke at Oxford University about 21C existentialism; in 2022, she discussed the connection between art and philosophy on a panel at the annual UCL conference.

Hades has been working on a collection of political poems and a future project for an art gallery, Superblue.

Hades' first book, High Tide, became had sales of over 10,000 and was listed as number seven on Amazon's UK Poetry list. In 2019, it also entered the Top 20 in the USA Poetry charts.

Personal life
At age 8, she fled to London with her family after her father was murdered in Saint Petersburg, Russia.

In 2022, following the 2022 Russian invasion of Ukraine, she donated £30,000 to charities aiding Ukrainian refugees and publicly called for Putin to be tried for war crimes.

References

Living people
1992 births
British women poets
Russian refugees